Hammerhead is a supervillain appearing in American comic books published by Marvel Comics. The character is usually depicted as an adversary of the superhero Spider-Man. He is a temperamental mobster who often dresses and acts in the 1920s style, and a prominent member of the Maggia, a fictional organized crime syndicate. Following an accident, he had most of his skull replaced with an inflexible steel alloy by Jonas Harrow, giving his head a flattened shape and near-indestructibility, hence his nickname. The Hammerhead crime family, of which he is the second and current head, is named after the character.

Hammerhead has made appearances in several forms of media outside of comics, including animated series and video games. IGN ranked him as Spider-Man's 20th greatest enemy.

Publication history

Hammerhead made his first appearance in The Amazing Spider-Man #113, and was created by writer Gerry Conway and artist John Romita Sr.

Conway recalled that Hammerhead "was most directly influenced by the Big Man and the Crime-Master, who were among the first villains in Amazing Spider-Man. One of the more interesting things Stan [Lee], Jack Kirby, and, of course, Steve Ditko did was combining the two different kinds of milieus: superhero and Dick Tracy, with the unusual criminal characters who had some kind of physical deformity... Plus, Hammerhead—I liked [the] name, and John Romita came up with an interesting look".

Fictional character biography
Hammerhead's family immigrated from the Soviet Union to Italy when he was a child with help from a man known only as the General. His father ran a garage in Toirrano, where he insisted the young man speak only in Russian, beating him severely with a mallet when he would not. Although not much is known about his life before he became a criminal and supervillain, Hammerhead is known to be married and has a sister named Antonia.

All the while, Hammerhead dreamed of becoming a gangster. He is eventually recruited into one of the "families" of the criminal organization known as the Maggia when a member oversees Hammerhead "making his bones" by murdering a childhood bully and his girlfriend in a theater showing The Godfather Part II. Originally a small-time hitman, Hammerhead quickly rises through the ranks of the Maggia, while pretending to be ethnically Italian so he can be "made", or fully initiated member. In his final test, Hammerhead is brought to his father's garage (with the Maggia apparently unaware of their relationship). Hammerhead proceeds to kill his father, while saying Russian that he blames his father's abuse for making him a villain.

One day, Hammerhead was found beaten, disfigured, and delirious with pain in an alley in New York City's Bowery by Jonas Harrow, a surgeon who had lost his medical license due to his illegal experiments. Seeing the opportunity both to save this man's life and to redeem his reputation, Harrow operated on the gunman for three days, replacing much of his shattered skull with a strong steel alloy. During the surgery, the unconscious thug fixated on the only memory he retained: an image of a poster for a movie called "The Al Capone Mob", which was hanging in the alley where he lay beaten and bloodied before Harrow found him. When he recovered, the memory of the poster and its images of 1930s-era gangsters prompted Hammerhead to start a gang of his own in the style of Capone and other mobsters of the 1920s. He even dressed as if he were living in that decade.

A gang war broke out between Hammerhead's mob and Doctor Octopus's criminal organization. Hammerhead was forced to flee the country due to Spider-Man's interference. He later had a rematch with Doctor Octopus next to an atomic breeder reactor on a remote Canadian island which caused a chain reaction, blasting Hammerhead "out of phase" with this dimension. Some time later, he appeared as an immaterial ghost-like being to haunt Doctor Octopus. Doctor Octopus then unwittingly used a particle accelerator to restore Hammerhead to his corporeal form. Hammerhead kidnapped Spider-Man's Aunt May, who was then rescued by Spider-Man as Doctor Octopus caused Hammerhead's helicopter to plummet into the Hudson River.

Hammerhead then proposed that all Maggia families unite under his leadership. Wearing a strength-enhancing exoskeleton, he battled the Human Torch, who then fused the exoskeleton's power pack. Hammerhead was nearly assassinated by the Kingpin's minion the Arranger during a gang war. Despite surviving the assassination, Hammerhead was ultimately forced out of a major role in New York City organized crime by the Kingpin.

Hammerhead then allied himself with the Chameleon in the latter's bid to become the new crime lord of New York City. The two served as partners in a splinter group of the Maggia. Hammerhead hired Tombstone as a bodyguard and hitman. He hired the Hobgoblin to kill Joe Robertson, who posed a threat to Tombstone; the assassination attempt failed. Hammerhead was kidnapped and beaten by Tombstone, who had gained superhuman powers and resented Hammerhead for not sending him to kill Joe Robertson.

Hammerhead later attended a Las Vegas crime conference to divide the resources left by the Kingpin's downfall at the time. Around this time, he participates in a multi-sided gang-war focused on the Kingpin's attempt to re-take New York City for his own.

Hammerhead is a major player in underworld activities in the Marvel Universe and is highly sought after for elimination by the Punisher. He becomes one of several gang warlords struggling to control the criminal underworld in the major cities of the Eastern United States. During one of the first meetings of such warlords, Hammerhead was almost killed by the Strucker twins. This meeting was being manipulated by Baron Strucker, the head of HYDRA. When Don Fortunato made a bid for control of the New York underworld, Hammerhead opposed him and was almost killed as a result. When every other crime lord surrendered to Fortunato and his HYDRA allies, Hammerhead went rogue, launching a raid on Fortunato's home and successfully fighting off a HYDRA attack on his own headquarters.  He did have assistance from Spider-Man and Morbius the Living Vampire, however. For a time, the hero known as S.H.O.C. also assists Hammerhead. Later, he was hired by Norman Osborn to be a part of the Sinister Twelve.

During the events of the "Civil War", Hammerhead used the vacuum left by the incarceration of the Kingpin to gain a greater foothold in the ranks of organized crime, attempting to organize an army of costumed villains (consisting of the Ani-Men V, the Answer I, the Aura, Bloodshed, the Clown, the Cyclone III, the Discus, Electro, the Great Gambonnos, the Kangaroo II, Man Mountain Marko, the Mauler, Mindblast, Override, the Ringmaster, Stiletto, the Spot, the Squid, Slyde, the Trapster, and the Will O' the Wisp) to enforce his new criminal empire. When Slyde balked at the idea, Hammerhead had Underworld kill him to serve as a warning to anyone who did not join up with him. The Kingpin manipulated various hero factions, most notably S.H.I.E.L.D. and Iron Man, into breaking up Hammerhead's first convening of his army. During the conflict, Hammerhead was shot numerous times by Underworld, who was revealed to be working for the Kingpin. Underworld later confronted Hammerhead while he lay in prison and shot him at point-blank range with adamantium bullets.

The bullets, while not penetrating his skull, did cause severe trauma to his brain, resulting him in needing surgery, but the hospital he was brought to was unable to treat him. In mid-surgery however, men working for the Kingpin's rival Mister Negative came in, killed the hospital staff, and took Hammerhead away. Mister Negative then has his surgeon Doctor Trauma revive Hammerhead and offers to transplant his brain into a new robotic adamantium skeleton, which Hammerhead agrees to.

The operation is a complete success, and Hammerhead is restored to full mobility without any ill effects. He swears loyalty to Mister Negative in exchange for his restored life and proceeds to shape a gang of lowlife thugs into an effective army for his benefactor. He then proceeds to battle Spider-Man, besting him with no effort for the first time in years. Later, he has a rematch with Spider-Man, with Spider-Man dislocating Hammerhead's hip bone.

Mister Negative sends Hammerhead to help Spider-Man (who Mister Negative corrupted) take down the Hood, who launches an attack on Negative's headquarters. He blackmails H.A.M.M.E.R. director Norman Osborn into forcing the Hood to pull out of Chinatown.

Hammerhead later begins to doubt his loyalty to Mister Negative when Silvermane, a deceased former Maggia don and an old enemy of the Kingpin, appears to return. Unknown to Hammerhead, "Silvermane" is actually an android controlled by Mysterio to plant seeds of rebellion. Nevertheless, he flees a shootout with the Maggia when the Silvermane robot calls him a traitor. It is shown that Mister Negative had a computer chip put in Hammerhead's head to deliver an electroshock when necessary, which he promptly uses to punish him and remind him who is in charge.

During the Origin of the Species storyline, Hammerhead and Mister Negative are among the supervillains invited by Doctor Octopus to join his supervillain team, promising them that they will receive a reward in exchange for securing some specific items for him.

Alongside his nephew and minions, Hammerhead formed an alliance with the Black Cat, where he sided with her gang.

Hammerhead is among the crime lords competing with Mister Negative in obtaining the Tablet of Life and Destiny in order to win the favor of Mayor Wilson Fisk.

Powers and abilities

Hammerhead has no superhuman abilities, yet his skull is now surgically reinforced with vibranium (or secondary adamantium), making his head flat on top; with this, he can charge and break through objects such as brick walls without causing any pain or damage to himself. This metal can absorb physical impacts that would otherwise fracture human bone. Hammerhead is in peak physical condition comparable to that of an Olympic-level athlete. He is a formidable hand-to-hand combatant whose most dangerous tactic is charging head first like a bull toward an opponent. Hammerhead once utilized a strength-enhancing exoskeleton designed by the Tinkerer.

After an assassin's adamantium bullet penetrated a part of his head not protected by his adamantium skull, Hammerhead is surgically rebuilt by Mister Negative. Breakout surgeries replace the upper half of his skeleton with an adamantium endo-skeleton (the skeleton is shown to have a network of hydraulic servomechanisms). The upper portion of his body is now superhumanly strong as a result of the additional hidden cybernetic musculature, making him able to effortlessly beat a superpowered foe such as Spider-Man. Mister Negative does not use on Hammerhead the same Lord Dark Wind bonding process, used on the similarly empowered Wolverine and Lady Deathstrike for coating their bones in adamantium: instead he replaces Hammerhead's bones with replicas fashioned in the invulnerable metal. It is still unknown how his artificial skeleton can carry on biological functions.

The intervention of Mr. Negative also radically changed Hammerhead's personality. Hammerhead now recalls his life as a Russian immigrant prior to the accident in which he adopted the 1920s gangster persona. Consequently, Hammerhead no longer speaks like a 1920s movie gangster, but instead behaves as a typical modern Russian mobster and hitman, as this was apparently his original personality prior to his head injury.

Hammerhead is highly skilled in the organization, concealment and management of criminal enterprises. He is an effective hitman, a skilled marksman (his preferred weapon was the Thompson submachine gun), and an excellent street fighter. In his original incarnation, Hammerhead was able to hold his own against Spider-Man despite being an ordinary human by using his superhumanly durable skull as a blunt instrument. After his recent augmentation, he is now capable of grappling with and physically overpowering Spider-Man to the extent that he could eventually crush his foe.

Reception
 In 2022, Screen Rant included Hammerhead in their "10 Spider-Man Villains That Are Smarter Than They Seem" list.
 In 2022, CBR.com ranked Hammerhead 10th in their "10 Most Violent Spider-Man Villains" list.

Other versions

House of M
In the House of M reality, Hammerhead is one of the gang leaders defeated by Luke Cage in his rise to power in Sapien Town.

Marvel Zombies
In the Marvel Zombies vs. The Army of Darkness miniseries, Hammerhead briefly appears, along with the Owl and the Kingpin, at a meeting to discuss how to survive the zombie outbreak. This version of Hammerhead is ultimately killed by the Punisher.

Ultimate Marvel
The Ultimate Marvel version of Hammerhead first appears in Ultimate X-Men #13-14 as a mobster named Joseph who has killed the parents of an unnamed little girl. The girl stumbles upon local street performer/magician Gambit, taking the girl in and decides to protect her from the mob. The girl is kidnapped and Gambit goes on a rampage to find her, blindly running into an ambush Hammerhead set up. Gambit gets out of the ambush and chases Hammerhead down and ends with Gambit charging Hammerhead's inorganic skull full of bio-kinetic energy and causes his head to explode. In Ultimate Spider-Man, Hammerhead was revealed to have survived Gambit's attack, though how is not explained ("It sucked. I came back."). He kills Silvermane in the beginning of the Warriors story arc and becomes the Enforcers' new leader and he burns down one of the Kingpin's warehouses. After an intense battle with Spider-Man, the Black Cat, the Moon Knight, Iron Fist and Shang-Chi, he was put in a coma when Elektra brutally stabbed him in the chest with her sai and flung him out of a window.

Marvel MAX
An alternate version of Hammerhead appears as one of the antagonists in the Cage miniseries by Brian Azzarello and Richard Corben. This version of the character is a deformed gangster named Sonny "The Hammer" Caputo, who is embroiled in a gang war with Tombstone.

Age of Ultron
During the "Age of Ultron" storyline, a reality where Ultron nearly annihilated the human race has Hammerhead and the Owl capturing the Superior Spider-Man and hoping to trade him to Ultron. Hawkeye came to the Superior Spider-Man's rescue as the Ultron Sentinels attack.

Earth-001
During the Spider-Verse storyline, the Earth-001 version of Hammerhead appears as a member of Verna's Hounds.

In other media

Television
 Hammerhead appears in the Spider-Man (1981) episode "Wrath of the Sub-Mariner", voiced by William Boyett.
 Hammerhead appears in Spider-Man: The Animated Series, voiced by Nicky Blair. The metal used in this version's head is adamantium and he initially serves Silvermane before being fired by him and hired by the Kingpin, whom Hammerhead serves loyally for the rest of the series.
 Hammerhead appears in The Spectacular Spider-Man, voiced by John DiMaggio. This version is more cool-headed and intelligent than past incarnations and wields brass knuckles along with his usual strength. Additionally, he originally worked for Silvermane and was in a romantic relationship with his daughter, Sable Manfredi, before they broke up and Hammerhead became an enforcer for Tombstone. Throughout the series, Hammerhead acts on Tombstone's behalf by manufacturing supervillains to distract Spider-Man from Tombstone's operations. However, Tombstone eventually becomes fed up with Hammerhead's failures and begins conducting business without him. While contacting Norman Osborn to create another supervillain, Hammerhead becomes inspired to betray his boss, unknowingly contributing to Osborn's plan to take Tombstone out of play. Secretly calling for a Valentine's Day summit between Tombstone, Silvermane, and Doctor Octopus, Hammerhead attempts to manipulate the assembled crime bosses into killing each other. However, Spider-Man foils his plan by getting all of the bosses arrested, leading Tombstone to fire Hammerhead.
 A Marvel Noir-inspired incarnation of Hammerhead appears in the Ultimate Spider-Man episode "Return to the Spider-Verse" [Pt. 3], voiced by Jon Polito. This version is a crime boss, rival of Joe Fixit, and employed Martin Li as a henchman until Li becomes Mister Negative.
 Hammerhead appears in Spider-Man (2017), voiced by Jim Cummings. This version is a crime boss who previously employed Flint Marko and Randy Macklin and has a spoiled son named Tull (voiced by Laura Bailey.) Debuting in the episode "Sandman", he inadvertently causes Marko's transformation into the titular character after burying him in toxic waste and sand after Marko failed him one too many times. This also mutated Flint's daughter, Keemia Marko, whom Hammerhead took in as his new henchwoman after finding a way to stabilize her condition. After Sandman and Spider-Man join forces to rescue Keemia, the web-slinger defeats Hammerhead and his henchmen and leaves them for the police. Following this, Hammerhead makes minor reappearances in the episodes "Spider-Man on Ice", "How I Thwipped My Summer Vacation", "My Own Worst Enemy", and "Spider-Man Unmasked" [Pt. 2].

Video games
 Hammerhead appears in Spider-Man (1995).
 Hammerhead appears as a boss in Spider-Man 2: Enter Electro, voiced by Dee Bradley Baker. This version is an underling of Electro.
 Hammerhead appears as a boss in Spider-Man: Mysterio's Menace.
 A Marvel Noir-inspired incarnation of Hammerhead appears as a boss in Spider-Man: Shattered Dimensions, voiced again by John DiMaggio. While he does not appear in the original Marvel Noir comics, the developers felt "he would be a perfect fit for the Noir universe". Born Joseph Lorenzini, this version was born with a deformed head and a flat, thick skull. He initially worked as a circus freak under the nickname "The Human Bulldozer" before being recruited by Norman "The Goblin" Osborn to serve as his gang's loan shark and enforcer. After being sent to New Jersey to retrieve a fragment of the Tablet of Order and Chaos and running afoul of Spider-Man Noir, Hammerhead uses the fragment to merge himself with his twin Tommy guns, intending to overthrow Osborn as the head of New York's criminal underworld. In the end, Spider-Man Noir defeats him and claims the fragment.
 Hammerhead appears as a boss in Marvel: Avengers Alliance.
 Hammerhead appears as a boss in the mobile version of The Amazing Spider-Man 2, voiced by Dave Boat. This version is a gang leader at war with the Russian Mob, led by Kraven the Hunter.
 Hammerhead appears as a playable character and boss in Lego Marvel Super Heroes 2. This version is a gang boss in Manhattan Noir.
 A variation of Hammerhead infected with a Venom symbiote appears as a playable character in Spider-Man Unlimited.
 Hammerhead appears as a boss in the Spider-Man (2018) DLC The City That Never Sleeps, voiced by Keith Silverstein. Similarly to his comics counterpart, this version, aka Joseph Martello, is a powerful and notorious crime boss within the Maggia and has a metal plate in his skull that was implanted after a failed assassination attempt. Following the power vacuum created by the Kingpin and Mister Negative's arrests in the main game, the Maggia became embroiled in a gang war for control over New York's criminal underworld. While attempting to seize power for his faction and eliminate the other Maggia leaders, Hammerhead transforms himself into a cyborg, only to be defeated by Spider-Man and Silver Sable.

Miscellaneous
Hammerhead makes a minor appearance in Spider-Man: Turn Off the Dark.

References

External links
 Hammerhead at Marvel.com

Characters created by Gerry Conway
Characters created by John Romita Sr.
Comics characters introduced in 1972
Fictional characters with superhuman durability or invulnerability
Fictional crime bosses
Fictional henchmen
Fictional immigrants to the United States
Fictional gangsters
Marvel Comics characters with superhuman strength
Marvel Comics cyborgs
Marvel Comics supervillains
Spider-Man characters
Video game bosses
Villains in animated television series